Cladonia pocillum is a species of lichen in the family Cladoniaceae. Swedish botanist Erik Acharius first formally described the species in 1803 as Baeomyces pocillum, but Olivier Jules Richard transferred it to the genus Cladonia in 1877.

Ecology
Cladonia pocillum is host to numerous species of lichenicolous fungi. These include:

 Arthonia epicladonia
 Bachmanniomyces uncialicola
 Cercidospora cladoniicola
 Cercidospora punctillata
 Dactylospora deminuta
 Epicladonia sandstedei
 Epicladonia simplex
 Epicladonia stenospora
 Lichenoconium pyxidatae
 Lichenocsticta alcicornaria
 Phaeosporobolus alpinus
 Phoma sp.
 Polycoccum laursenii
 Pronectria tibellae
 Protothelenella santessonii
 Rinodina egedeana
 Roselliniella cladoniae
 Sphaerellothecium araneosum var. cladoniae
 Taeniolella beschiana

See also
 List of Cladonia species

References

Sources

 
 
 

pocillum
Lichen species
Lichens described in 1803
Lichens of Europe
Lichens of North America
Taxa named by Erik Acharius